The men's marathon competition at the 1998 Asian Games in Bangkok, Thailand was held on 20 December.

Schedule
All times are Indochina Time (UTC+07:00)

Results
Legend
DNF — Did not finish

References

External links
Results

Men's marathon
1998
1998 Asian Games
Asian
1998 Asian Games